Giorgio Pestelli (born 1938) is an Italian musicologist.

His 1967 edition of the 555 keyboard sonatas of Domenico Scarlatti purports to correct some anachronisms and provides an alternative numbering system (distinguished by P numbers) to those of Alessandro Longo (L numbers) and Ralph Kirkpatrick (K or Kk numbers).

He has authored several books, including L'età di Mozart e di Beethoven (1979, 1991), Canti del destino. Studi su Brahms (2000, Viareggio Price, 2001), and Gli Immortali. Come comporre una discoteca di musica classica (2004).

See also
 List of solo keyboard sonatas by Domenico Scarlatti

Notes

1938 births
Living people
Italian musicologists
Viareggio Prize winners
Classical music catalogues